Lidia Esperanza Magaz Jaime (February 24, 1922 – May 6, 2013) was a telenovela television actress. She played under the name of Esperanza Magaz.

Born in Havana, Cuba, Magaz relocated to Caracas, Venezuela, in 1953. She ended up as a well-recognized supporting character actress, primarily on RCTV and Venevisión, while playing a variety of assorted supporting roles in dozens of telenovelas between the 1960s and the early 2012s.

She died in Caracas, Venezuela from Hodgkin's lymphoma at the age of 92.

Selected roles
Amantes
El Desafío
Doña Bárbara
Esmeralda
La Inolvidable
La Revancha
Kassandra
La Zulianita
Natalia del Mar
Rafaela
Toda una dama

Sources

Televen – Falleció la primera actriz Esperanza Magaz (Spanish)
Últimas Noticias – Murió la primera actriz Esperanza Magaz (Spanish)

1922 births
2013 deaths
Cuban emigrants to Venezuela
Cuban television actresses
Deaths from cancer in Venezuela
Deaths from Hodgkin lymphoma
People from Havana
Venezuelan telenovela actresses